David Cohen (born 1968) is a serial entrepreneur and the founder of Pinpoint Technologies, iContact.com, and Earfeeder. He is also an angel investor with a portfolio of more than 100 companies. Cohen is best known as the co-founder of Techstars, a mentorship-based startup accelerator.

Cohen delivered the keynote speech at RailsConf2012, a conference dedicated to Ruby on Rails, an open source web application framework for the Ruby programming language.

He and Brad Feld co-authored Do More Faster: Techstars Lessons to Accelerate Your Startup.

Early life and education

Cohen was born in 1968 in DeLand, FL.

Early career

Cohen began working as a software engineer in 1991 when he became the Director of Development for Automated Dispatch Services, Inc., where he worked until 1994.

Cohen founded Pinpoint Technologies in 1993. He served as its CTO and vice president of research and development. The company developed public safety and EMS dispatch vehicle software. Zoll Medical Corporation acquired Pinpoint Technologies in 1999. Cohen stayed on with the company until 2004.

Cohen then founded iContact.com. iContact.com was a social networking service for mobile devices. It is now defunct. In an interview with weblog The Rise to the Top and on his Techstars profile, Cohen refers to this company as "a graceful failure" because it returned 78% of its funding to outside investors. Writing on his blog, Cohen said the company “failed well by deciding to cut our losses before we spent all the money trying to make something happen. The writing was on the wall, so we read it.”

In 2006, Cohen founded the music service earFeeder.com. SonicSwap bought earFeeder.com in 2006.

Techstars

Cohen is the founder and co-CEO of Techstars, a startup accelerator program. Cohen co-founded Techstars in 2006 with Brad Feld, Jared Polis, and David Brown. The first program ran in 2007. Cohen designed Techstars to improve the existing system of angel investing and to provide more support to startups. In a speech at the Future of Entrepreneurship Education Summit, Cohen said that he was particularly interested in improving the entrepreneurial ecosystem of Techstars' launch city, Boulder, Colorado. Now, Techstars has dozens of locations globally that accept new startups regularly.

The Techstars experience has also been turned into a reality TV show on Bloomberg TV. Techstars invests $118,000 in each of its program startups. The startups also receive mentorship and pitch opportunities during the program. Techstars accepts approximately 1% of applicants. The company focuses on transparency and publishes detailed success and failure information of all companies that have gone through Techstars. Cohen controls four private seed-equity funds. He raised his first $5 million fund in 2009. In 2012, he raised $28 million for a second fund. To date, Cohen has invested in more than 2,500 startups as an angel investor and through Techstars.

Boards

Cohen serves on the Board of Advisors of the Computer Science Department of the University of Colorado. He is on the Entrepreneurship Advisory Board at Silicon Flatirons.

Personal

Cohen is married with three children. In his personal time, Cohen enjoys technology, software startups, and tennis. Cohen lives in Boulder, Colorado.

Works

Cohen is the co-author of Do More Faster with Brad Feld. Do More Faster shares advice for first-time entrepreneurs from the Techstars program. It includes essays from other Techstars mentors and company founders. Cohen also blogs at DavidGCohen.com. The blog focuses on startup and technology topics.

In 2012, Cohen delivered the keynote speech at RailsConf2012 and at the inaugural Silicon Prairie Awards. In 2011, he spoke at the Future of Entrepreneurship Education Summit. He has interviewed for the Silicon Flatirons Entrepreneurs Unplugged Series.

References

External links

David G. Cohen
Techstars

American technology chief executives
Living people
1968 births